François Heisbourg (born 24 June 1949) is currently Senior Advisor for Europe at the International Institute for Strategic Studies (IISS) and Special Advisor at the Paris-based Fondation pour la Recherche Stratégique. He was director of the IISS from 1987 to 1992  and its chairman from 2001 to 2018.

Publications
Books published in France since 2000, by order of publication:
 2001 : Hyperterrorisme, la nouvelle guerre, (avec la FRS), Éditions Odile Jacob 
 2004 : 11 septembre, rapport de La commission d'enquête, de la Commission nationale sur les attaques terroristes contre les États-Unis (préface), Les Équateurs 
 2005 : La Fin de l'Occident. L’Amérique, l'Europe et le Moyen-Orient, Ed. Odile Jacob
 2006 : Le Terrorisme en France aujourd'hui (avec Jean-Luc Marret), Les Équateurs
 2007 : L’Épaisseur du monde, Stock
 2007 : Iran, le choix des armes, Stock
 2009 : Après Al Qaida - La nouvelle génération du terrorisme, Stock
 2010 : Vainqueurs et vaincus, lendemains de crise, Stock
 2010 : Les Conséquences stratégiques de la crise (direction), Ed. Odile Jacob
 2011 : Les armes nucléaires ont-elles un avenir? (direction), Ed. Odile Jacob
 2011 : Espace militaire. L’Europe entre souveraineté et coopération (avec Xavier Pasco), Choiseul
 2012 : Espionnage et Renseignement. Le vrai dossier, Ed. Odile Jacob
 2013 : La Fin du rêve européen, Stock
 2015 : Secrètes histoires, Stock
 2016 : Comment perdre la guerre contre le terrorisme, Stock

References

1949 births
French diplomats
Living people
Sciences Po alumni
École nationale d'administration alumni
People from London